Westfjords was one of the multi-member constituencies of the Althing, the national legislature of Iceland. The constituency was established in 1959 following the nationwide extension of proportional representation for elections to the Althing. It was abolished in 2003 when the constituency was merged into the Northwestern constituency following the re-organisation of constituencies across Iceland. Westfjords was conterminous with the Westfjords region.

Election results

Summary

(Excludes compensatory seats.)

Detailed

1999
Results of the 1999 parliamentary election held on 8 May 1999:

The following candidates were elected:
Einar Kristinn Guðfinnsson (D), 1,435 votes; Einar Oddur Kristjánsson (D), 1,422 votes; Guðjón Arnar Kristjánsson (F), 859 votes; Kristinn H. Gunnarsson (B), 1,118 votes; and Sighvatur Kristinn Björgvinsson (S), 1,120 votes.

1995
Results of the 1995 parliamentary election held on 8 April 1995:

The following candidates were elected:
Einar Kristinn Guðfinnsson (D), 1,783 votes; Einar Oddur Kristjánsson (D), 1,784 votes; Gunnlaugur Sigmundsson (B), 1,083 votes; Kristinn H. Gunnarsson (G), 648 votes; and Sighvatur Kristinn Björgvinsson (A), 749 votes.

1991
Results of the 1991 parliamentary election held on 20 April 1991:

The following candidates were elected:
Einar Kristinn Guðfinnsson (D), 1,942 votes; Jóna Valgerður Kristjánsdóttir (V), 443 votes; Kristinn H. Gunnarsson (G), 617 votes; Matthías Bjarnasson (D), 1,938 votes; Ólafur Þ. Þórðarson (B), 1,562 votes; and Sighvatur Kristinn Björgvinsson (A), 890 votes.

1987
Results of the 1987 parliamentary election held on 25 April 1987:

The following candidates were elected:
Karvel Pálmasson (A), 1,123 votes; Matthías Bjarnasson (D), 1,730 votes; Ólafur Þ. Þórðarson (B), 1,209 votes; Sighvatur Kristinn Björgvinsson (A), 1,139 votes; and Þorvaldur Garðar Kristjánsson (D), 1,732 votes.

1983
Results of the 1983 parliamentary election held on 23 April 1983:

The following candidates were elected:
Karvel Pálmasson (A), 913 votes; Matthías Bjarnasson (D), 1,509 votes; Ólafur Þ. Þórðarson (B), 1,358 votes; Steingrímur Hermannsson (B), 1,509 votes; and Þorvaldur Garðar Kristjánsson (D), 1,359 votes.

1979
Results of the 1979 parliamentary election held on 2 and 3 December 1979:

The following candidates were elected:
Karvel Pálmasson (A), 1,069 votes; Matthías Bjarnasson (D), 1,733 votes; Ólafur Þ. Þórðarson (B), 1,479 votes; Sighvatur Kristinn Björgvinsson (A), 1,187 votes; Steingrímur Hermannsson (B), 1,645 votes; and Þorvaldur Garðar Kristjánsson (D), 1,557 votes.

1978
Results of the 1978 parliamentary election held on 25 June 1978:

The following candidates were elected:
Kjartan Ólafsson (G), 937 votes; Matthías Bjarnasson (D), 1,579 votes; Sighvatur Kristinn Björgvinsson (A), 808 votes; Steingrímur Hermannsson (B), 1,113 votes; and Þorvaldur Garðar Kristjánsson (D), 1,416 votes.

1974
Results of the 1974 parliamentary election held on 30 June 1974:

The following candidates were elected:
Gunnlaugur Finnsson (B), 1,292 votes; Karvel Pálmason (F), 711 votes; Matthías Bjarnasson (D), 1,796 votes; Sighvatur Kristinn Björgvinsson (A), 495 votes; Sigurlaug Bjarnadóttir (D), 599 votes; Steingrímur Hermannsson (B), 1,431 votes; and Þorvaldur Garðar Kristjánsson (D), 1,623 votes.

1971
Results of the 1971 parliamentary election held on 13 June 1971:

The following candidates were elected:
Bjarni Guðbjörnsson (B), 1,333 votes; Hannibal Valdimarsson (F), 1,229 votes; Karvel Pálmason (F), 615 votes; Matthías Bjarnasson (D), 1,493 votes; Steingrímur Hermannsson (B), 1,508 votes; and Þorvaldur Garðar Kristjánsson (D), 1,342 votes.

1967
Results of the 1967 parliamentary election held on 11 June 1967:

The following candidates were elected:
Birgir Finnsson (A), 704 votes; Bjarni Guðbjörnsson (B), 1,621 votes; Matthías Bjarnasson (D), 1,435 votes; Sigurður Bjarnason (D), 1,604 votes; Sigurvin Einarsson (B), 1,794 votes; and Steingrímur Pálsson (G), 611 votes.

1963
Results of the 1963 parliamentary election held on 9 June 1963:

The following candidates were elected:
Birgir Finnsson (A), 692 votes; Hannibal Valdimarsson (G), 744 votes; Hermann Jónasson (B), 1,742 votes; Matthías Bjarnasson (D), 571 votes; Sigurður Bjarnason (D), 1,701 votes; Sigurvin Einarsson (B), 1,567 votes; and Þorvaldur Garðar Kristjánsson (D), 1,520 votes.

October 1959
Results of the October 1959 parliamentary election held on 25 and 26 October 1959:

The following candidates were elected:
Birgir Finnsson (A), 678 votes; Gísli Jónsson (D), 1,948 votes; Hannibal Valdimarsson (G), 658 votes; Hermann Jónasson (B), 1,741 votes; Kjartan J. Jóhannsson (D), 1,754 votes; and Sigurvin Einarsson (B), 1,566 votes.

References

1959 establishments in Iceland
2003 disestablishments in Iceland
Constituencies established in 1959
Constituencies disestablished in 2003
Former Althing constituencies
Althing constituency